Munio Pillinger was a male Austrian international table tennis player.

Career 
He won two bronze medals at the 1926 World Table Tennis Championships in the men's doubles with Paul Flussmann and men's singles and a silver medal in the men's team. Two years later he won a silver medal at the 1928 World Table Tennis Championships in the men's team event.

See also 
 List of table tennis players
 List of World Table Tennis Championships medalists

References 

Austrian male table tennis players
World Table Tennis Championships medalists